Lubowidz  is a town in Żuromin County, Masovian Voivodeship, in east-central Poland. It is the seat of the gmina (administrative district) called Gmina Lubowidz.

The town has a population of 1,798.

References

Lubowidz